The 1880 United States presidential election in Missouri took place on November 2, 1880, as part of the 1880 United States presidential election. Voters chose 15 representatives, or electors to the Electoral College, who voted for president and vice president.

Missouri voted for the Democratic nominee, Winfield Scott Hancock, over the Republican nominee, James A. Garfield by a margin of 13.83%.

Results

See also
 United States presidential elections in Missouri

References

Missouri
1880
1880 Missouri elections